Hyksos (Egyptian ḥqꜣ(w)-ḫꜣswt, Egyptological pronunciation: hekau khasut, "ruler(s) of foreign lands") is a term which, in modern Egyptology, designates the kings of the Fifteenth Dynasty of Egypt (fl. c. 1650–1550 BC). 
The seat of power of these kings was the city of Avaris in the Nile delta, from where they ruled over Lower and Middle Egypt up to Cusae. 
In the Aegyptiaca, a history of Egypt written by the Greco-Egyptian priest and historian Manetho in the 3rd century BC, the term Hyksos is used ethnically to designate people of probable West Semitic, Levantine origin.
While Manetho portrayed the Hyksos as invaders and oppressors, this interpretation is questioned in modern Egyptology. Instead, Hyksos rule might have been preceded by groups of Canaanite peoples who gradually settled in the Nile delta from the end of the Twelfth Dynasty onwards and who may have seceded from the crumbling and unstable Egyptian control at some point during the Thirteenth Dynasty.

The Hyksos period marks the first in which Egypt was ruled by foreign rulers. Many details of their rule, such as the true extent of their kingdom and even the names and order of their kings, remain uncertain. The Hyksos practiced many Levantine or Canaanite customs as well as many Egyptian customs. They have been credited with introducing several technological innovations to Egypt, such as the horse and chariot, as well as the sickle sword and the composite bow, a theory which is disputed.

The Hyksos did not control all of Egypt. Instead, they coexisted with the Sixteenth and Seventeenth Dynasties, which were based in Thebes. Warfare between the Hyksos and the pharaohs of the late Seventeenth Dynasty eventually culminated in the defeat of the Hyksos by Ahmose I, who founded the Eighteenth Dynasty of Egypt. In the following centuries, the Egyptians would portray the Hyksos as bloodthirsty and oppressive foreign rulers.

Name

Etymology

The Greek form is likely a textual corruption of an earlier .

The first century AD Jewish historian Josephus gives the name as meaning "shepherd kings" or "captive kings" in his Contra Apion (Against Apion), where he describes the Hyksos as Jews as they appeared in the Hellenistic Egyptian historian Manetho. 
This whole nation was styled Hycsos, that is, Shepherd-kings: for the first syllable Hyc, according to the sacred dialect, denotes a king, as is Sos a shepherd. But this according to the ordinary dialect, and of these is compounded Hycsos; but some say that these people were Arabians.

It is unclear if this translation was found in Manetho; an Armenian translation of an epitome of Manetho given by the late antique historian Eusebius gives the correct translation of "foreign kings".

Use
"It is now commonly accepted in academic publications that the term  refers only to the individual foreign rulers of the late Second Intermediate Period," especially of the Fifteenth Dynasty, rather than a people. However, it was used as an ethnic term by Josephus. Its use to refer to the population still persists in some academic papers.

In Ancient Egypt, the term "Hyksos " was also used to refer to various Nubian and especially Asiatic rulers both before and after the Fifteenth Dynasty. It was used at least since the Sixth Dynasty of Egypt (c. 2345–2181 BC) to designate chieftains from the Syro-Palestine area. One of its earliest recorded uses is found c. 1900 BC in the tomb of Khnumhotep II of the Twelfth Dynasty to label a nomad or Canaanite ruler named "Abisha the Hyksos"
(using the standard 𓋾𓈎𓈉, ḥḳꜣ-ḫꜣswt, "Heqa-kasut" for "Hyksos").

Based on the use of the name in a Hyksos inscription of Sakir-Har from Avaris, the name was used by the Hyksos as a title for themselves. However, Kim Ryholt, argues that "Hyksos" was not an official title of the rulers of the Fifteenth Dynasty, and is never encountered together with royal titulary, only appearing as the title in the case of Sakir-Har. According to Ryholt, "Hyksos" was rather a generic term which is encountered separately from royal titulary, and in regnal lists after the end of the Fifteenth Dynasty itself. However, Vera Müller writes: "Considering that S-k-r-h-r is also mentioned with three names of the traditional Egyptian titulary (Horus name, Golden Falcon name and Two Ladies name) on the same monument, this argument is somehow strange." Danielle Candelora and Manfred Bietak also argue that the Hyksos used the title officially. All other texts in the Ancient Egyptian language do not call the Hyksos by this name, instead referring to them as Asiatics, with the possible exception of the Turin King List in a hypothetical reconstruction from a fragment. The title is not attested for the Hyksos king Apepi, possibly indicating an "increased adoption of Egyptian decorum".

Scarabs also attest the use of this title for pharaohs usually assigned to the Fourteenth or Sixteenth Dynasty of Egypt, who are sometimes called "'lesser' Hyksos." The Theban Seventeenth Dynasty of Egypt is also given the title in some versions of Manetho, a fact which Bietak attributes to textual corruption. In the Twenty-fifth Dynasty of Egypt and during the Ptolemaic Period, the term Hyksos was adopted as a personal title and epithet by a number of pharaohs or high Egyptian officials, including the Theban official Mentuemhat, Philip III of Macedon, and Ptolemy XIII. It was also used on the tomb of Egyptian grand priest Petosiris at Tuna el-Gebel in 300 BC to designate the Persian ruler Artaxerxes III, although it is unknown if Artaxerxes adopted this title for himself.

Origins

Ancient historians

In his epitome of Manetho, Josephus connected the Hyksos with the Jews, but he also calls them Arabs. In their own epitomes of Manetho, the Late antique historians Sextus Julius Africanus and Eusebius say that the Hyksos came from Phoenicia. Until the excavation and discovery of Tell El-Dab'a (the site of the Hyksos capital Avaris) in 1966, historians relied on these accounts for the Hyksos period.

Modern historians
Material finds at Tell El-Dab'a indicate that the Hyksos originated in the Levant. The Hyksos' personal names indicate that they spoke a Western Semitic language and "may be called for convenience sake Canaanites."

Kamose, the last king of the Theban Seventeenth Dynasty, refers to Apepi as a "Chieftain of Retjenu" in a stela that implies a Levantine background for this Hyksos king. According to Anna-Latifa Mourad, the Egyptian application of the term  to the Hyksos could indicate a range of backgrounds, including newly arrived Levantines or people of mixed Levantine-Egyptian origin.

Due to the work of Manfred Bietak, which found similarities in architecture, ceramics, and burial practices, scholars currently favor a northern Levantine origin of the Hyksos. Based particularly on temple architecture, Bietak argues for strong parallels between the religious practices of the Hyksos at Avaris with those of the area around Byblos, Ugarit, Alalakh, and Tell Brak, defining the "spiritual home" of the Hyksos as "in northernmost Syria and northern Mesopotamia". The connection of the Hyksos to Retjenu also suggests a northern Levantine origin: "Theoretically, it is feasible to deduce that the early Hyksos, as the later Apophis, were of elite ancestry from Rṯnw, a toponym [...] cautiously linked with the Northern Levant and the northern region of the Southern Levant."

Earlier arguments that the Hyksos names might be Hurrian have been rejected, while early-twentieth-century proposals that the Hyksos were Indo-Europeans "fitted European dreams of Indo-European supremacy, now discredited."

A study of dental traits by Nina Maaranen and Sonia Zakrzewski in 2021 on 90 people of Avaris indicated that individuals defined as locals and non-locals were not ancestrally different from one another. The results were said to be in line with the archaeological evidence, suggesting Avaris was an important hub in the Middle Bronze Age eastern Mediterranean trade network, welcoming people from beyond its borders.

History

Early contacts between Egypt and the Levant

Historical records suggest that Semitic people and Egyptians had contacts at all periods of Egypt's history. The MacGregor plaque, an early Egyptian tablet dating to 3000 BC records "The first occasion of striking the East", with the picture of Pharaoh Den smiting a Western Asiatic enemy.

During the reign of Senusret II, c. 1890 BC, parties of Western Asiatic foreigners visiting the Pharaoh with gifts are recorded, as in the tomb paintings of 12th-dynasty official Khnumhotep II. These foreigners, possibly Canaanites or nomads, are labelled as Aamu, including the leading man with a Nubian ibex labelled as Abisha the Hyksos (𓋾𓈎𓈉 ḥḳꜣ-ḫꜣsw, Heqa-kasut for "Hyksos"), the first known instance of the name "Hyksos".
 
Soon after, the Sebek-khu Stele, dated to the reign of Senusret III (reign: 1878–1839 BC), records the earliest known Egyptian military campaign in the Levant. The text reads "His Majesty proceeded northward to overthrow the Asiatics. His Majesty reached a foreign country of which the name was Sekmem (...) Then Sekmem fell, together with the wretched Retenu", where Sekmem (s-k-m-m) is thought to be Shechem and "Retenu" or "Retjenu" are associated with ancient Syria.

Background and arrival in Egypt
The only ancient account of the whole Hyksos period is by the Hellenistic Egyptian historian Manetho, who, however, exists only as quoted by others. As recorded by Josephus, Manetho describes the beginning of Hyksos rule thusly:
A people of ignoble origin from the east, whose coming was unforeseen, had the audacity to invade the country, which they mastered by main force without difficulty or even battle. Having overpowered the chiefs, they then savagely burnt the cities, razed the temples of the gods to the ground, and treated the whole native population with the utmost cruelty, massacring some, and carrying off the wives and children of others into slavery (Contra Apion I.75-77).

Manetho's invasion narrative is "nowadays rejected by most scholars." It is likely that he was influenced by more recent foreign invasions of Egypt.  Instead, it appears that the establishment of Hyksos rule was mostly peaceful and did not involve an invasion of an entirely foreign population.  Archaeology shows a continuous Asiatic presence at Avaris for over 150 years before the beginning of Hyksos rule, with gradual Canaanite settlement beginning there  during the Twelfth Dynasty. Strontium isotope analysis of the inhabitants of Middle Kingdom and Second Intermediate Period Avaris also dismissed the invasion model in favor of a migration one. Contrary to the model of a foreign invasion, the study didn't find more males moving into the region, but instead found a sex bias towards females. with a high proportion of 77% of females being non-locals.

Manfred Bietak argues that Hyksos "should be understood within a repetitive pattern of the attraction of Egypt for western Asiatic population groups that came in search of a living in the country, especially the Delta, since prehistoric times." He notes that Egypt had long depended on the Levant for expertise in areas of shipbuilding and seafaring, with possible depictions of Asiatic shipbuilders being found from reliefs from the Sixth Dynasty ruler Sahure. The Twelfth Dynasty of Egypt is known to have had many Asiatic immigrants serving as soldiers, household or temple serfs, and various other jobs. Avaris in the Nile Delta attracted many Asiatic immigrants in its role as a hub of international trade and seafaring.

The final powerful pharaoh of the Egyptian Thirteenth Dynasty was Sobekhotep IV, who died around 1725 BC, after which Egypt appears to have splintered into various kingdoms, including one based at Avaris ruled by the Fourteenth Dynasty. Based on their names, this dynasty was already primarily of West Asian origin. After an event in which their palace was burned, the Fourteenth Dynasty would be replaced by the Hyksos Fifteenth Dynasty, which would establish "loose control over northern Egypt by intimidation or force," thus greatly expanding the area under Avaris's control.

Kim Ryholt argues that the Fifteenth Dynasty invaded and displaced the Fourteenth, however Alexander Ilin-Tomich argues that this is "not sufficiently substantiated." Bietak interprets a stela of Neferhotep III to indicate that Egypt was overrun by roving mercenaries around the time of the Hyksos ascension to power.

Kingdom

 
The length of time the Hyksos ruled is unclear. The fragmentary Turin King List says that there were six Hyksos kings who collectively ruled 108 years, however in 2018 Kim Ryholt proposed a new reading of as many as 149 years, while Thomas Schneider proposed a length between 160 and 180 years. The rule of the Hyksos overlaps with that of the native Egyptian pharaohs of the Sixteenth and Seventeenth Dynasties, better known as the Second Intermediate Period.

The area under direct control of the Hyksos was probably limited to the eastern Nile delta. Their capital city was Avaris at a fork on the now-dry Pelusiac branch of the Nile. Memphis may have also been an important administrative center, although the nature of any Hyksos presence there remains unclear.

According to Anna-Latifa Mourad, other sites with likely Levantine populations or strong Levantine connections in the Delta include Tell Farasha and Tell el-Maghud, located between Tell Basta and Avaris, El-Khata'na, southwest of Avaris, and Inshas. The increased prosperity of Avaris may have attracted more Levantines to settle in the eastern Delta. Kom el-Hisn at the edge of the Western Delta, shows Near-Eastern goods but individuals mostly buried in an Egyptian style, which Mourad takes to mean that they were most likely  Egyptians heavily influenced by Levantine traditions or, more likely, Egyptianized Levantines. The site of Tell Basta (Bubastis), at the confluence of the Pelusiac and Tanitic branches of the Nile, contains monuments to the Hyksos kings Khyan and Apepi, but little other evidence of Levantine habitation. Tell el-Habwa (Tjaru), located on a branch of the Nile near the Sinai, also shows evidence of non-Egyptian presence, however the majority of the population appears to have been Egyptian or Egyptianized Levantines. Tell El-Habwa would have provided Avaris with grain and trade goods.

In the Wadi Tumilat, Tell el-Maskhuta shows a great deal of Levantine pottery and an occupation history closely correlated to the Fifteenth Dynasty, nearby Tell el-Rataba and Tell el-Sahaba show possible Hyksos-style burials and occupation, Tell el-Yahudiyah, located between Memphis and the Wadi Tumilat, contains a large earthwork that may have been built by the Hyksos, as well as evidence of Levantine burials from as early as the Thirteenth Dynasty. The Hyksos settlements in the Wadi Tumilat would have provided access to Sinai, the southern Levant, and possibly the Red Sea.

The sites Tell el-Kabir, Tell Yehud, Tell Fawziya, and Tell Geziret el-Faras are noted by scholars other than Mourad to contain "elements of 'Hyksos culture'", but there is no published archaeological material for them.

The Hyksos claimed to be rulers of both Lower and Upper Egypt; however, their southern border was marked at Hermopolis and Cusae. Some objects might suggest a Hyksos presence in Upper Egypt, but they may have been Theban war booty or attest simply to short term raids, trade, or diplomatic contact. The nature of Hyksos control over the region of Thebes remains unclear. Most likely Hyksos rule covered the area from Middle Egypt to southern Palestine. Older scholarship believed, due to the distribution of Hyksos goods with the names of Hyksos rulers in places such as Baghdad and Knossos, that Hyksos had ruled a vast empire, but it seems more likely to have been the result of diplomatic gift exchange and far-flung trade networks.

Wars with the Seventeenth Dynasty
The conflict between Thebes and the Hyksos is known exclusively from pro-Theban sources, and it is difficult to construct a chronology. These sources propagandistically portray the conflict as a war of national liberation. This perspective was formerly taken by scholars as well but is no longer thought to be accurate.

Hostilities between the Hyksos and the Theban Seventeenth Dynasty appear to have begun during the reign of Theban king Seqenenra Taa. Seqenenra Taa's mummy shows that he was killed by several blows of an axe to the head, apparently in battle with the Hyksos. It is unclear why hostilities may have started, but the much later fragmentary New Kingdom tale The Quarrel of Apophis and Seqenenre blames the Hyksos ruler Apepi/Apophis for initiating the conflict by demanding that Seqenenra Taa remove a pool of hippopotamuses near Thebes. However, this is a satire on the Egyptian story-telling genre of the "king's novel" rather than a historical text. A contemporary inscription at Wadi el Hôl may also refer to hostilities between Seqenenra and Apepi.

Three years later, c. 1542 BC, Seqenenra Taa's successor Kamose initiated a campaign against several cities loyal to the Hyksos, the account of which is preserved on three monumental stelae set up at Karnak. The first of the three, Carnarvon Tablet includes a complaint by Kamose about the divided and occupied state of Egypt:

To what effect do I perceive it, my might, while a ruler is in Avaris and another in Kush, I sitting joined with an Asiatic and a Nubian, each man having his (own) portion of this Egypt, sharing the land with me. There is no passing him as far as Memphis, the water of Egypt. He has possession of Hermopolis, and no man can rest, being deprived by the levies of the Setiu. I shall engage in battle with him and I shall slit his body, for my intention is to save Egypt, striking the Asiatics.

Following a common literary device, Kamose's advisors are portrayed as trying to dissuade the king, but the king attacks anyway. He recounts his destruction of the city of Nefrusy as well as several other cities loyal to the Hyksos. On a second stele, Kamose claims to have captured Avaris, but returned to Thebes after capturing a messenger between Apepi and the king of Kush. Kamose appears to have died soon afterward (c. 1540 BC).

Ahmose I continued the war against the Hyksos, most likely conquering Memphis, Tjaru and Heliopolis early in his reign, the latter two of which are mentioned in an entry of the Rhind mathematical papyrus. Knowledge of Ahmose I's campaigns against the Hyksos mostly comes from the tomb of Ahmose, son of Ebana, who gives a first person account claiming that Ahmose I sacked Avaris:
Then there was fighting in Egypt to the south of this town [Avaris], and I carried off a man as a living captive. I went down into the water—for he was captured on the city side—and crossed the water carrying him. [...] Then Avaris was despoiled, and I brought spoil from there.

Thomas Schneider places the conquest in year 18 of Ahmose's reign. However, excavations of Tell El-Dab'a (Avaris) show no widespread destruction of the city, which instead seems to have been abandoned by the Hyksos. Manetho, as recorded in Josephus, states that the Hyksos were allowed to leave after concluding a treaty:
Thoumosis ... invested the walls [of Avaris] with an army of 480,000 men, and endeavoured to reduce [the Hyksos] to submission by siege. Despairing of achieving his object, he concluded a treaty, under which [the Hyksos] were all to evacuate Egypt and go whither they would unmolested. Upon these terms no fewer than two hundred and forty thousand, entire households with their possessions, left Egypt and traversed the desert to Syria. (Contra Apion I.88-89)
Although Manetho indicates that the Hyksos population was expelled to the Levant, there is no archaeological evidence for this, and Manfred Bietak argues on the basis of archaeological finds throughout Egypt that it is likely that numerous Asiatics were resettled in other locations in Egypt as artisans and craftsmen. Many may have remained at Avaris, as pottery and scarabs with typical "Hyksos" forms continued to be produced uninterrupted throughout the Eastern Delta. Canaanite cults also continued to be worshiped at Avaris.

Following the capture of Avaris, Ahmose, son of Ebana records that Ahmose I captured Sharuhen (possibly Tell el-Ajjul), which some scholars argue was a city in Canaan under Hyksos control.

Rule and administration

Administration
The Hyksos show a mix of Egyptian and Levantine cultural traits. Their rulers adopted the full Ancient Egyptian royal titulary and employed Egyptian scribes and officials. They also used Near-Eastern forms of administration, such as employing a chancellor as the head of their administration.

Rulers
The names, the order, length of rule, and even the total number of the Fifteenth Dynasty rulers are not known with full certainty. After the end of their rule, the Hyksos kings were not considered to have been legitimate rulers of Egypt and were therefore omitted from most king lists. The fragmentary Turin King List included six Hyksos kings, however only the name of the last, Khamudi, is preserved. Six names are also preserved in the various epitomes of Manetho, however, it is difficult to reconcile the Turin King List and other sources with names known from Manetho, largely due to the "corrupted name forms" in Manetho. The name Apepi/Apophis appears in multiple sources, however.

Various other archaeological sources also provide names of rulers with the Hyksos title, however, the majority of kings from the second intermediate period are attested once on a single object, with only three exceptions. Ryholt associates two other rulers known from inscriptions with the dynasty, Khyan and Sakir-Har. The name of Khyan's son, Yanassi, is also preserved from Tell El-Dab'a. The two best attested kings are Khyan and Apepi. Scholars generally agree that Apepi and Khamudi are the last two kings of the dynasty, and Apepi is attested as a contemporary of Seventeenth-Dynasty pharaohs Kamose and Ahmose I. Ryholt has proposed that Yanassi did not rule and that Khyan directly preceded Apepi, but most scholars agree that the order of kings is: Khyan, Yanassi, Apepi, Khamudi. There is less agreement on the early rulers. Sakir-Har is proposed by Schneider, Ryholt, and Bietak to have been the first king.

Recently, archaeological finds have suggested that Khyan may actually have been a contemporary of Thirteenth-Dynasty pharaoh Sobekhotep IV, potentially making him an early rather than a late Hyksos ruler. This has prompted attempts to reconsider the entire chronology of the Hyksos period, which as of 2018 had not yet reached any consensus.

Some kings are attested from either fragments of the Turin King List or from other sources who may have been Hyksos rulers. According to Ryholt, kings Semqen and Aperanat, known from the Turin King List, may have been early Hyksos rulers, however Jürgen von Beckerath assigns these kings to the Sixteenth Dynasty of Egypt. Another king known from scarabs, Sheshi, is believed by many scholars to be a Hyksos king, however Ryholt assigns this king to the Fourteenth Dynasty of Egypt. Manfred Bietak proposes that a king recorded as Yaqub-Har may also have been a Hyksos king of the Fifteenth Dynasty. Bietak suggests that many of the other kings attested on scarabs may have been vassal kings of the Hyksos.

None of the proposed identifications besides of Apepi and Apophis is considered certain.

In Sextus Julius Africanus's epitome of Manetho, the rulers of Sixteenth Dynasty are also identified as "shepherds" (i.e. Hyksos) rulers. Following the work of Ryholt in 1997, most but not all scholars now identify the Sixteenth Dynasty as a native Egyptian dynasty based in Thebes, following Eusebius's epitome of Manetho; this dynasty would be contemporary to the Hyksos.

Diplomacy

The Hyksos engagement in long-distance diplomacy is confirmed by a cuneiform letter discovered in the ruins of Avaris. Hyksos diplomacy with Crete and ancient Near East is also confirmed by the presence of gifts from the Hyksos court in those places. Khyan, one of the Hyksos rulers, is known for his wide-ranging contacts, as objects in his name have been  found at Knossos and Hattusha indicating diplomatic contacts with Crete and the Hittites, and a sphinx with his name was bought on the art market at Baghdad and might demonstrate diplomatic contacts with Babylon, possibly with the first Kassites ruler Gandash.

The Theban rulers of the Seventeenth Dynasty are known to have imitated the Hyksos both in their architecture and regnal names. There is evidence of friendly relations between the Hyksos and Thebes, including possibly a marriage alliance, prior to the reign of the Theban pharaoh Seqenenra Taa.

An intercepted letter between Apepi and the Nubian King of Kerma (also called Kush) to the south of Egypt recorded on the Carnarvon Tablet has been interpreted as evidence of an alliance between the Hyksos and Kermans. Intensive contacts between Kerma and the Hyksos are further attested by seals with the names of Asiatic rulers or with designs known from Avaris at Kerma. The troops of Kerma are known to have raided as far north as Elkab according to an inscription of Sobeknakht II. According to his second stele, Kamose was effectively caught between the campaign for the siege of Avaris in the north and the offensive of Kerma in the south; it is unknown whether or not the Kermans and Hyksos were able to combine forces against him. Kamose reports returning "in triumph" to Thebes, but Lutz Popko suggests that this "was perhaps a mere tactical retreat to prevent a war on two fronts". Ahmose I was also forced to confront a threat from the Nubians during his own siege of Avaris: he was able to stop the forces of Kerma by sending a strong fleet, killing their ruler named A'ata. Ahmose I boasts about these successes on his tomb at Thebes. The Kermans also appear to have provided mercenaries to the Hyksos.

Vassalage
Many scholars have described the Egyptian dynasties contemporary to the Hyksos as "vassal" dynasties, an idea partially derived from the Nineteenth-Dynasty literary text The Quarrel of Apophis and Seqenenre, in which it is said "the entire land paid tribute to him [Apepi], delivering their taxes in full as well as bringing all good produce of Egypt." The belief in Hyksos vassalage was challenged by Ryholt as "a baseless assumption." Roxana Flammini suggests instead that Hyksos exerted influence through (sometimes imposed) personal relationships and gift-giving. Manfred Bietak continues to refer to Hyksos vassals, including minor dynasties of West Semitic rulers in Egypt.

Society and culture

Royal construction and patronage

The Hyksos do not appear to have produced any court art, instead appropriating monuments from earlier dynasties by writing their names on them. Many of these are inscribed with the name of King Khyan. A large palace at Avaris has been uncovered, built in the Levantine rather than the Egyptian style, most likely by Khyan. King Apepi is known to have patronized Egyptian scribal culture, commissioning the copying of the Rhind Mathematical Papyrus. The stories preserved in the Westcar Papyrus may also date from his reign.

The so-called "Hyksos sphinxes" or "Tanite sphinxes" are a group of royal sphinxes depicting the earlier pharaoh Amenemhat III (Twelfth Dynasty) with some unusual traits compared to conventional statuary, for example prominent cheekbones and the thick mane of a lion, instead of the traditional nemes headcloth. The name "Hyksos sphinxes" was given due to the fact that these were later reinscribed by several of the Hyksos kings, and were initially thought to represent the Hyksos kings themselves. Nineteenth-century scholars attempted to use the statues' features to assign a racial origin to the Hyksos. These Sphinxes were seized by the Hyksos from cities of the Middle Kingdom and then transported to their capital Avaris where they were reinscribed with the names of their new owners and adorned their palace. Seven of those sphinxes are known, all from Tanis, and now mostly located in the Cairo Museum. Other statues of Amenehat III were found in Tanis and are associated with the Hyksos in the same manner.

Burial practices
Evidence for distinct Hyksos burial practices in the archaeological record include burying their dead within settlements rather than outside them like the Egyptians. While some of the tombs include Egyptian-style chapels, they also include burials of young females, probably sacrifices, placed in front of the tomb chamber. There are also no surviving Hyksos funeral monuments in the desert in the Egyptian style, though these may have been destroyed. The Hyksos also interred infants who died in imported Canaanite amphorae. The Hyksos also practiced the burial of horses and other equids, likely a composite custom of the Egyptian association of the god Set with the donkey and near-eastern notions of equids as representing status.

Technology

The Hyksos use of horse burials suggest that the Hyksos introduced both the horse and the chariot to Egypt, however no archaeological, pictorial, or textual evidence exists that the Hyksos possessed chariots, which are first mentioned as ridden by the Egyptians in warfare against them by Ahmose, son of Ebana, at the close of Hyksos rule. In any case, it does not appear that chariots played any large role in the Hyksos rise to power or their expulsion. Josef Wegner further argues that horse-riding may have been present in Egypt as early as the late Middle Kingdom, prior to the adoption of chariot technology.

Traditionally, the Hyksos have also been credited with introducing a number of other military innovations, such as the sickle-sword and composite bow; however, "[t]o what extent the kingdom of Avaris should be credited for these innovations is debatable," with scholarly opinion currently divided. It is also possible that the Hyksos introduced more advanced bronze working techniques, though this is inconclusive. They may have worn full-body armor, whereas the Egyptians did not wear armor or helmets until the New Kingdom.

The Hyksos also introduced better weaving techniques and new musical instruments to Egypt. They introduced improvements in viniculture as well.

Trade and economy

The early period of Hyksos period established their capital of Avaris "as the commercial capital of the Delta". The trading relations of the Hyksos were mainly with Canaan and Cyprus. Trade with Canaan is said to have been "intensive", especially with many imports of Canaanite wares, and may have reflected the Canaanite origins of the dynasty. Trade was mostly with the cities of the northern Levant, but connections with the southern Levant also developed. Additionally, trade was conducted with Faiyum, Memphis, oases in Egypt, Nubia, and Mesopotamia. Trade relations with Cyprus were also very important, particularly at the end of the Hyksos period. Aaron Burke has interpreted the equid burials in Avaris of evidence that the people buried with them were involved in the caravan trade. Anna-Latifa Mourad argues that "Hyksos were particularly interested in opening new avenues of trade, securing strategic posts in the eastern Delta that could give access to land-based and sea-based trade routes." These include the apparent Hyksos settlements of Tell el-Habwa I and Tell el-Maskhuta in the eastern Delta.

According to the Kamose stelae, the Hyksos imported "chariots and horses, ships, timber, gold, lapis lazuli, silver, turquoise, bronze, axes without number, oil, incense, fat and honey". The Hyksos also exported large quantities of material looted from southern Egypt, especially Egyptian sculptures, to the areas of Canaan and Syria. These transfers of Egyptian artifacts to the Near East may especially be attributed to king Apepi. The Hyksos also produced local, Levantine-influenced industries, such as Tell el-Yahudiyeh Ware.

There is little evidence of trade between Upper and Lower Egypt during the Hyksos period, and Manfred Bietak proposes that there was "a mutual trade boycott". Bietak proposes that this decreased the Hyksos ability to trade with the Mediterranean and weakened their economy.

Religion

Temples in Avaris existed both in Egyptian and Levantine style, the latter presumably for Levantine gods. The Hyksos are known to have worshiped the Canaanite storm god Baal, who was associated with the Egyptian god Set. Set appears to have been the patron god of Avaris as early as the Fourteenth Dynasty. Hyksos iconography of their kings on some scarabs shows a mixture of Egyptian pharaonic dress with a raised club, the iconography of Baal. Despite later sources claiming the Hyksos were opposed to the worship of other gods, votive objects given by Hyksos rulers to gods such as Ra, Hathor, Sobek, and Wadjet have also survived.

Potential biblical connections

In the Manethonian-Josephus tradition
Josephus, and most of the writers of antiquity, associated the Hyksos with the Jews. Quoting from Manetho's Aegyptiaca, Josephus states that when the Hyksos were expelled from Egypt, they founded Jerusalem (Contra Apion I.90). It is unclear if this is original to Manetho or Josephus's own addition, as Manetho does not mention "Jews" or "Hebrews" in his preserved account of the expulsion. Josephus's account of Manetho connects the expulsion of the Hyksos to another event two hundred years later, in which a group of lepers led by the priest Osarseph were expelled from Egypt to the abandoned Avaris. There they ally with the Hyksos and rule over Egypt for thirteen years before being driven out, during which time they oppress the Egyptians and destroy their temples. After the expulsion, Osarseph changes his name to Moses (Contra Apion I.227-250). Assmann argues that this second account is largely a mixture of the experiences of the later Amarna period with the Hyksos invasion, with Osarseph likely standing in for Akhenaten. The final mention of Osarseph, in which he changes his name to Moses, may be a later interpolation. The second account is sometimes held not to have been written by Manetho at all.

In modern scholarship

The majority of modern scholars do not believe that the Egyptian story elements in the Bible can be demonstrated with historical methods. However, some scholars have attempted to tie the narratives of the Hyksos period to the exodus period.

Scholars such as Jan Assmann and Donald Redford, for instance, have suggested that the story of the biblical exodus may have been wholly or partially inspired by the expulsion of the Hyksos. An identification with the Hyksos would only depart minimally from accepted biblical chronology, and their expulsion is the only known large-scale expulsion of Asiatics from Egypt. Other scholars, such with Manfred Bietak, have pointed out several problems with such theories, including the conflict between the portrayal of the Hyksos as a ruling elite with a background in trade and seafaring and the biblical portrayal of the Israelites as oppressed in Egypt.

John Bright states that Egyptian and Biblical records both suggest that Semitic people maintained access to Egypt at all periods of Egypt's history, and he suggested that it is tempting to suppose that Joseph who, according to the Old Testament (Genesis 39:50), was in favour at the Egyptian court and held high administrative positions next to the ruler of the land, was associated to the Hyksos rule in Egypt during the Fifteenth Dynasty. Such a connection might have been facilitated by their shared Semitic ethnicity. He also wrote that there is no proof for these events. Howard Vos has suggested that the "coat of many colors" said to have been worn by Joseph could be similar to the colorful garments seen in the painting of foreigners in the tomb of Khnumhotep II.

Ronald B. Geobey notes a number of problems with identifying the narrative of Joseph with events either prior to or during the Hyksos' rule, such as the detail that the Egyptians abhorred Joseph's people ("shepherds"; Gen. 46:31) and numerous anachronisms. Manfred Bietak suggests that the story fits better with the ambience of the later Twentieth Dynasty of Egypt, in particular with the xenophobic policy of pharaoh Setnakhte (1189–1186 BC). And Donald Redford argues that "to read [the Joseph story] as history is quite wrongheaded," while Megan Bishop Moore and Brad E. Kelle note the lack of any extra-biblical evidence for the events of Genesis, including the Joseph story, or Exodus.

A number of scholars do not believe that the exodus has any historical basis at all, while only those on the fundamentalist fringes accept the entire biblical account "unless [it] can be absolutely disproved". The current consensus among archaeologists is that, if an Israelite exodus from Egypt occurred, it must have happened instead in the Nineteenth Dynasty of Egypt (13th century BC), given the first appearance of a distinctive Israelite culture in the archaeological record. The potential connection of the Hyksos to the exodus is no longer a central focus of scholarly study of the Hyksos, but this supposed connection to the Exodus has continued to inspire popular interest.

Legacy

The Hyksos' rule continued to be condemned by New Kingdom pharaohs such as Hatshepsut, who, 80 years after their defeat, claimed to rebuild many shrines and temples which they had neglected.

Ramses II moved Egypt's capital to the Delta, building Pi-Ramesses on the site of Avaris, where he set up a stela marking the 400th anniversary of the cult of Set. Scholars used to suggest that this marked 400 years since the Hyksos had established their rule, however the lists of Ramesses' ancestors continued to omit the Hyksos and there is no evidence that they were honored during his reign. The Turin King List, which includes the Hyksos and all other disputed or disgraced former rulers of Egypt, appears to date from the reign of Ramesses or one of his successors. The Hyksos are marked as foreign kings via a throw-stick determinative rather than a divine determinative after their names, and the use of the title  rather than the usual royal title. Kim Ryholt notes that these measures are unique to the Hyksos rulers and "may therefore have been a direct result of what seems to have been deliberate attempt to obliterate the memory of their kingship after their defeat."

Egyptian presence in the Levant
It is "often accepted" that Egypt established an empire in Canaan at the end of the wars against the Hyksos. Campaigns against locations in Canaan and Syria were conducted by Ahmose I and Thutmose I at the beginning of the Eighteenth Dynasty, as recorded in the tombs of Ahmose, son of Ebana and Ahmose pen-Nekhebet; Thutmose I is also mentioned as having hunted elephants in Syria in inscriptions at the temple of Hatshepsut at Deir el-Bahari. Thutmose III is known to have campaigned widely, conquering the "Shasu" Bedouins of northern Canaan, and the land of Retjenu, as far as Syria and Mittani in numerous military campaigns circa 1450 BC. However, Felix Höflmayer argues that there is little evidence of other campaigns and that "there is no evidence that would suggest such a scenario" as an Egyptian empire during the Eighteenth Dynasty. As regards claims that the campaigns in the Near East were spurred on by Hyksos rule, Thomas Schneider argues that "the empire building started with a delay of two generations and seeing a direct nexus may be as much a historical fallacy as it would be to link the fall of the Soviet Union in 1989 to the end of the Second World War in 1945, two generations earlier."

Later accounts

The Nineteenth-Dynasty story The Quarrel of Apophis and Seqenenre claimed that the Hyksos worshiped no god but Set, making the conflict into one between Ra, the patron of Thebes, and Set as patron of Avaris. Furthermore, the battle with the Hyksos was interpreted in light of the mythical battle between the gods Horus and Set, transforming Set into an Asiatic deity while also allowing for the integration of Asiatics into Egyptian society.

Manetho's portrayal of the Hyksos, written nearly 1300 years after the end of Hyksos rule and found in Josephus, is even more negative than the New Kingdom sources. This account portrayed the Hyksos "as violent conquerors and oppressors of Egypt" has been highly influential for perceptions of the Hyksos until modern times. Marc van de Mieroop argues that Josephus's portrayal of the initial Hyksos invasion is no more trustworthy than his later claims that they were related to the Exodus, supposedly portrayed in Manetho as performed by a band of lepers.

Early modern depictions
The discovery of the Hyksos in the 19th century, and their study following the decipherment of ancient Egyptian scripts, led to various theories about their history, origin, ethnicity and appearance, often illustrated with picturesque and imaginative details.

See also

Mitanni
Kassites
Sea peoples
Philistines
Maryannu

Anra scarab (artifact)

Notes

Citations

References

External links 

 
Fifteenth Dynasty of Egypt
Canaan
Semitic-speaking peoples
Nile Delta
Invasions of Egypt